Kerrick Jackson is an American baseball coach and former pitcher, who is the current head baseball coach of the Memphis Tigers. He played college baseball at St. Louis Community College, Bethune–Cookman and Nebraska from 1994–1997. He then served as the head coach of the Southern Jaguars (2018–2020). He also served as the President of the MLB Draft League in 2021.

Amateur career
Jackson attended Kirkwood High School in Kirkwood, Missouri. He played on both the baseball and basketball teams. Upon graduation, Jackson enrolled at St. Louis Community College. After graduating from STLCC, Jackson accepted a baseball scholarship offer from Bethune–Cookman University. Jackson then transferred to play for the Nebraska Cornhuskers baseball program as a senior.

Coaching career
Jackson's first college coaching job came as an assistant for the Fairfield Stags baseball program in 2001. The next season, Jackson became an assistant coach at Emporia State University. Jackson spent the 2003 season as an assistant at Coffeyville Community College before moving on to Jefferson College for the 2004 and 2005 seasons. Jackson coached at Nicholls State University from 2006–2007 and St. Louis Community College in 2008.

Jackson left college baseball to become a professional scout for the Washington Nationals from 2008 to 2010.

On August 14, 2010, Jackson was named the recruiting coordinator and assistant coach for the Missouri Tigers baseball program under coach Tim Jamieson. On May 27, 2015, Jackson left his position with Missouri because of his wife's promotion. Jackson spent his two year hiatus from coaching as an agent.

On July 25, 2017, Jackon returned to coaching as the head coach of the Southern Jaguars baseball team.

In 2019, Coach Jackson led the Southern Jaguars baseball team to the SWAC Baseball Tournament championship and a berth in the 2019 NCAA Baseball Tournament. Southern was eliminated after losses to the Mississippi State University Bulldogs in their first game, 11-6, and the University of Miami Hurricanes, 12-2, in the losers bracket elimination game on the following day. On November 30, 2020, Jackson resigned as head coach of the Southern Jaguars to accept a position as the President of MLB Draft League.

After just a year with the MLB Draft League, Jackson returned to coaching collegiate baseball, being named the head coach of the Memphis Tigers.

Head coaching record

See also
 List of current NCAA Division I baseball coaches

References

External links
Southern Jaguars bio

Living people
Baseball pitchers
STLCC Archers baseball players
Bethune–Cookman Wildcats baseball players
Nebraska Cornhuskers baseball players
Fairfield Stags baseball coaches
Emporia State Hornets baseball coaches
Coffeyville Red Ravens baseball coaches
Nicholls Colonels baseball coaches
STLCC Archers baseball coaches
Missouri Tigers baseball coaches
Southern Jaguars baseball coaches
People from Kirkwood, Missouri
Year of birth missing (living people)
African-American baseball coaches